Eva Wittke (born 18 July 1951) is a retired German swimmer. She competed in the 400 m individual medley and 4×100 m medley relay at the 1968 Summer Olympics and finished fifth in the latter event.

She married Jochen Herbst, a German swimmer who also competed at the 1968 Olympics. Their daughter Sabine Herbst-Klenz (born 1974) and son Stefan Herbst are also retired Olympic swimmers.
Her grandson Ramon Klenz is also a good swimmer.

References

1951 births
Living people
German female swimmers
Olympic swimmers of East Germany
Swimmers at the 1968 Summer Olympics
German female medley swimmers
People from Freital
Sportspeople from Saxony